= Doobdi =

- village
- Location within Madhya Pradesh Location within India
- Coordinates: 23.2118954°N 77.2261452°E
- Country: India
- State: Madhya Pradesh
- District: Bhopal
- Tehsil: Huzur
- Elevation: 519 m (1,703 ft)

Population (2011)
  - Total: 417
- Time zone: UTC+5:30 (IST)
- ISO 3166 code: MP-IN
- 2011 census code: 482486

Doobdi is a village in the Bhopal district of Madhya Pradesh, India. It is located in the Huzur tehsil and the Phanda block.

== Demographics ==
According to the 2011 census of India, Doobdi has 87 households. The effective literacy rate (i.e. the literacy rate of population excluding children aged 6 and below) is 70.68%.

Demographics (2011 Census)
	Total	Male	Female
Population	417	213	204
Children aged below 6 years	52	24	28
Scheduled caste	11	6	5
Scheduled tribe	6	1	5
Literates	258	153	105
Workers (all)	112	103	9
Main workers (total)	49	41	8
Main workers: Cultivators	44	39	5
Main workers: Agricultural labourers	2	1	1
Main workers: Household industry workers	0	0	0
Main workers: Other	3	1	2
Marginal workers (total)	63	62	1
Marginal workers: Cultivators	1	1	0
Marginal workers: Agricultural labourers	62	61	1
Marginal workers: Household industry workers	0	0	0
Marginal workers: Others	0	0	0
Non-workers	305	110	195
